The South Texas League was a Class C level minor league baseball league that played from 1903 to 1906. League teams were based in Louisiana and Texas. Comprising four teams for its first three years, it expanded to six teams in its final season.

Cities represented
Austin, TX: Austin Senators 1906
Beaumont, TX: Beaumont Oil Gushers 1903; Beaumont Red Ravens 1904; Beaumont Oilers 1905–1906
Brenham, TX: Brenham Cotton Pickers 1905
Galveston, TX: Galveston Sand Crabs 1903–1906
Houston, TX: Houston Buffaloes 1903; Houston Lambs 1904;Houston Marvels 1905; Houston Buffaloes 1906
Lake Charles, LA: Lake Charles Creoles 1906
San Antonio, TX: San Antonio Mustangs 1903–1904; San Antonio Warriors 1905; San Antonio Bronchos 1906

Standings and statistics

1903–1904
1903 South Texas League
Playoff: San Antonio 7 games, Galveston 2.

1904 South Texas League
Playoff: Galveston 4 games, Houston 3.

1905–1906

1905 South Texas League
Beaumont (40–68) moved to Brenham (1–6) August 21; Brenham became an orphan team August 27 playing in Austin and San Antonio (4–7).

1906 South Texas League
Playoff: Austin 4 games, Houston 4; Austin was awarded the championship after Houston refused to stop using non–league players. An additional game was played after Austin had been awarded the title by forfeit.

Sources
The Encyclopedia of Minor League Baseball: Second Edition.
Image is user created not original.

Defunct minor baseball leagues in the United States
Baseball leagues in Texas
Baseball leagues in Louisiana
Sports in Galveston, Texas
Sports leagues established in 1903
Sports leagues disestablished in 1906
1903 establishments in Texas
1906 disestablishments in the United States